Concordia University (French: Université Concordia) is an English-language public research university located in Montreal, Quebec, Canada. Founded in 1974 following the merger of Loyola College and Sir George Williams University, Concordia is one of the three universities in Quebec where English is the primary language of instruction (the others being McGill and Bishop's). As of the 2020–21 academic year, there were 51,253 students enrolled in credit courses at Concordia, making the university among the largest in Canada by enrollment. With four faculties, a school of graduate studies and numerous colleges, centres and institutes, Concordia offers over 400 undergraduate and 200 graduate programs and courses.

Concordia is a non-sectarian and coeducational institution, with more than 230,000 alumni worldwide.
The university is a member of the Association of Universities and Colleges of Canada, International Association of Universities, Canadian Association of Research Libraries, Canadian University Society for Intercollegiate Debate, Canadian Bureau for International Education and Canadian University Press. The university's varsity teams, known as the Stingers, compete in the Quebec Student Sport Federation of U Sports.

History
Although the roots of its founding institutions go back more than 160 years, Concordia University was formed on August 24, 1974, through the merger of Loyola College (1896) and Sir George Williams University (1926). On February 16, 2017, Concordia University recognized that it is located on unceded Indigenous lands.

Loyola College

Loyola College traces its roots to an English-language program at the Jesuit Collège Sainte-Marie de Montréal (today part of the Université du Québec à Montréal) at the Sacred Heart Convent. In 1896, Loyola College was established at the corner of Bleury Street and Saint Catherine Street. Loyola College was named in honour of Ignatius of Loyola, founder of the Society of Jesus. On March 10, 1898, the institution was incorporated by the Government of Quebec and became a full-fledged college. The same year, following a fire, the college was relocated further west on Drummond Street, south of Saint Catherine Street. Although founded as a collège classique (the forerunners of Quebec's college system), Loyola began granting university degrees through Université Laval in 1903.

The college moved into the present west-end campus on Sherbrooke Street West in Notre-Dame-de-Grâce in 1916. The School of Sociology opened in 1918. Since Loyola College never became a chartered university, it did not have the ability to grant its own university degrees. In 1920, the institution became affiliated with Université de Montréal, which began granting its degrees instead of Université Laval.

Memorial bronze honour roll plaques in the entrance hall near the administrative offices are dedicated to those from Loyola College who fought in the First World War, Second World War and Korean War.

The inter-war period was marked by the shift of education in the institution, the collège classique education was replaced by humanistic education (Liberal Arts College) in 1940, and Loyola became a four-year institution. Theology and philosophy were taught to all students until 1972.

In 1940, the Faculty of Science and the Department of Engineering, which became a faculty in 1964, were created. In addition to providing the same undergraduate programs as other colleges, the institution also offered innovative fields of study at the time, such as exercise science and communication studies. Students could enrol in academic majors starting in 1953 and honours programs in 1958. Students graduating from Loyola could afterwards pursue graduate-level education in other universities, with a few earning Rhodes Scholarships.

Starting in 1958, Loyola also began offering its first evening courses for students not being able to go to school full-time. New courses were given in library science and faith community nursing. Since its creation, Loyola College had welcomed almost exclusively young English-speaking Catholic men as students. It became co-ed in 1959 and became less homogeneous with the ever-increasing number of foreign students.

Obtaining a university charter was an important issue in the 1960s. Although many wanted Loyola College to become Loyola University, the Government of Quebec preferred to annex it to Sir George Williams University. Negotiations began in 1968 and ended with the creation of Concordia University on August 24, 1974.

Sir George Williams University

In 1851, the first YMCA in North America was established on Ste. Helene Street in Old Montreal. Beginning in 1873, the YMCA offered evening classes to allow working people in the English-speaking community to pursue their education while working during the day. Sixty years later, the Montreal YMCA relocated to its current location on Stanley Street in Downtown Montreal. In 1926, the education program at the YMCA was reorganized as Sir George Williams College, named after George Williams, founder of the original YMCA in London, England, upon which the Montreal YMCA was based. In 1934, Sir George Williams College offered the first undergraduate credit course in adult education in Canada.

Sir George Williams College received its university charter from the provincial government in 1948, though it remained the education arm of the Montreal YMCA. Sir George Williams expanded into its first standalone building, the Norris Building, in 1956. In 1959, the college requested that the Quebec legislature amend its university charter, changing its name to Sir George Williams University. It established a Centre for Human Relations and Community Studies in 1963. Sir George Williams continued to hold classes in the YMCA building until the construction of the Henry F. Hall Building in 1966.

The university gained international attention in 1969 for what is known as the "Computer Centre Incident." Notably in spring 1968, six black West Indian students at Sir George Williams University accused a biology lecturer (later assistant professor) of racism. The complaint was lodged to the dean of students, Magnus Flynn. Dissatisfied with how the administration was handling their complaint, the students decided to make it a public issue in fall 1968. The students occupied and destroyed the Hall Building's ninth floor computer lab after threatening to do so should the riot squad be called. The events forced the university to re-evaluate its policies, leading to the creation of the Ombuds Office and establishment of the University Regulations on Rights and Responsibilities in April 1971. (See Sir George Williams Affair).

Following several years of discussions and planning, Sir George Williams University merged with Loyola College to create Concordia University in 1974. Concordia provided students with representative student organizations and greater power over administrative decisions at the university.

Merger
In 1968, in the wake of the Parent Commission Report, which recommended the secularization of Quebec's educational system, the Government of Quebec asked Loyola College and Sir George Williams University to consider some form of union. The proposed merger was discussed by the Loyola-Sir George Williams Joint Steering Committee, a committee created to analyze all forms of possible mergers of the two institutions. It was proposed, in 1969, to create a university federation that allowed students to take courses at both campuses without paying additional fees.

Criticized for the difficulties encountered by the cohesion of the various departments and faculties, this option was set aside, but not totally rejected by the Joint Steering Committee. The Joint Committee of Representatives of the Board of Trustees of Loyola College and the Board of Governors of Sir George Williams University was formed in December 1971 and in fall 1972 produced a document outlining the basis of a university with two campuses. While the committee considered a number of possible models, including that of a loose federation, the solution finally adopted was that of an integrated institution, Concordia University, operating under the existing charter of Sir George Williams University. Following several revisions in November 1972, the document became the main plan of the proposed merger. It was accepted by both institutions, which began the process of consolidating their operations.

In early 1973, the two institutions announced the merger would take place that fall. However, legal and administrative procedures delayed the merger for another year. On August 24, 1974, the Government of Quebec recognized the merger, thus creating Concordia University. The name was taken from the motto of the city of Montreal, Concordia salus (meaning "well-being through harmony").

Post-merger
The legal existence of Concordia dates from August 24, 1974. The integration of the various faculties of the two institutions into a coherent whole took several years. The five faculties of the new university were a combination of existing faculties and departments prior to the merger. There was a Faculty of Commerce, Faculty of Science and Faculty of Arts at Sir George Williams University. Additionally, there was a Faculty of Arts and Science at Loyola College. The Faculty of Engineering of both institutions had previously been combined.

The Faculty of Fine Arts was created in 1976.

The first phase of combination of the Faculties of Arts and Science began in 1977 and ended in 1985.

In the late 1980s, the Georges P. Vanier Library on the Loyola Campus was enlarged, while in 1992, the library on Sir George Williams Campus moved to the new J.W. McConnell Building. The Norris Building was closed the same year.

On August 24, 1992, Valery Fabrikant, a mechanical engineering professor, shot five colleagues, killing four, on the ninth floor of the Hall Building. Fabrikant was convicted of the murders and sentenced to life imprisonment. The university erected a memorial to the slain professors (four granite tables) in the Hall Building lobby.

Starting in 1998, the university entered a major phase of expansion to meet its growing student enrolment. In August 2003, Concordia inaugurated the Richard J. Renaud Science Complex on Loyola Campus.

In 2005, the university launched a major urban redevelopment project in the neighbourhood surrounding Sir George Williams Campus known as the Quartier Concordia. That same year, the Engineering, Computer Science and Visual Arts Integrated Complex opened its doors on Saint Catherine Street West between Guy Street and Mackay Street.

In September 2009, the university marked the opening of the new building for the John Molson School of Business.

In September 2015, the university held a ribbon cutting for the District 3 Innovation Center's new space on the sixth floor of Concordia's Faubourg Building.

Campuses

The university has two campuses, set approximately 7 km apart: Sir George Williams Campus in the downtown core of Montreal, in an area known as Quartier Concordia (around the Guy–Concordia Metro station), and Loyola Campus in the residential west-end district of Notre-Dame-de-Grâce. They are connected by free shuttle-bus service for students, faculty and staff.

Libraries, archives and galleries

Concordia University has three main library locations. The R. Howard Webster Library is located in the J.W. McConnell Building on the Sir George Williams Campus and the Georges P. Vanier Library is located on the Loyola Campus. On September 2, 2014, the Library opened the Grey Nuns Reading Room, a silent study space for Concordia students located in the former Chapel of the Invention of the Holy Cross. The Concordia Library houses several special and unique collections including the Azrieli Holocaust Collection and the Irving Layton Collection. Most special collections are located in the Vanier Library. The Library also maintains the university's institutional repository, Spectrum. The Library is a member of the Canadian Association of Research Libraries. The Library also has partnerships with the Canadian Research Knowledge Network and the Data Liberation Initiative.

Concordia's Henry F. Hall Building houses the Leonard and Bina Ellen Art Gallery Samuel Schecter, an art enthusiast and businessperson, set up two funds in 1962 to be used for the purchase of Canadian art at Sir George Williams University and at Loyola College (Montreal). When Sir George Williams University and Loyola College merged to form Concordia in 1974, their respective art collections were also combined. The collection of the Leonard and Bina Ellen Gallery consists of 1,700 paintings, sculptures, prints, photographs and videos, many of the works by 20th-century Canadian artists.

Concordia's Engineering, Computer Science and Visual Arts Complex houses the FOFA Gallery, a primary venue for exhibiting works by faculty, students and alumni of the Faculty of Fine Arts.

Concordia's Records Management and Archives stores official records of, or relating to, or people/activities connected with Concordia University and its two founding institutions. The collection consists of manuscripts, texts, photographs, audio-visual material and artifacts.

New buildings
In 2001, Concordia embarked on a mission to develop and expand the quality of the downtown campus, and to revive the west end in Montreal.

The university also acquired the historic Grey Nuns Mother House near its Sir George Williams Campus, for $18 million. Built in 1871, it would alone double the size of the current downtown campus. From 2007 to 2022, the university will begin occupying the building in four separate phases. The large property will house the Faculty of Fine Arts and possibly the Mel Hoppenheim School of Cinema, and other departments. Concordia Residence Life currently houses nearly 250 students each year in the Grey Nuns Building. The dorm rooms are among the largest in the country, as many of the rooms have been transformed from when the section of the Grey Nuns Building was occupied by the Grey Nuns. The site was designated a National Historic Site of Canada in 2011.

The Engineering, Computer Science and Visual Arts Integrated Complex (EV Building) at Saint Catherine Street and Guy Street was opened in September 2005. The building is directly connected to the Guy–Concordia Metro station and also houses Le Gym, a facility of Concordia's Department of Recreation and Athletics. Across the street, the 100-year-old TD Canada Trust building was donated to Concordia in 2005 by the Toronto-Dominion Bank.

Construction of the new John Molson Building (MB), the home of the John Molson School of Business located on the corner of Guy Street and De Maisonneuve Boulevard West, began in February 2007. At a ceremony at Concordia on October 30, 2006, the Quebec Minister of Education, Recreation and Sports, Jean-Marc Fournier, announced an investment of $60 million towards the construction of the new building. The government's $60 million represented about half of the total construction costs. Construction started on January 22, 2006, and the building was completed and opened in September 2009. The 15-story building now houses the John Molson School's 9,200 full- and part-time students under the same roof for the first time. The departments of contemporary dance, theatre and music also moved into the new MB Building. It is connected to the EV Building by a tunnel under Guy Street.

In April 2010, a 120-metre tunnel completed the underground connections of the Guy-Concordia Metro station with the Henry F. Hall Building and the J.W. McConnell Building.

Concordia opened the Applied Science Hub on the Loyola Campus in December 2020. The $63.1-million state-of-the-art facility — built thanks to $36.7 million in support from the Government of Canada and the Government of Quebec — was strategically designed to enable interdisciplinary collaboration and research between faculty and students in the Faculty of Arts and Science, Gina Cody School of Engineering and Computer Science as well as the District 3 Innovation Centre.

Quartier Concordia
Quartier Concordia is a neighbourhood redevelopment project centred around Concordia University's Sir George Williams Campus in downtown Montreal. Bordered by Sherbrooke Street to the north, Saint Mathieu Street to the west, René Lévesque Boulevard to the south and Bishop Street to the east, the district is designed to be a green urban campus that will improve the use and quality of public places and spaces, student life on campus and transportation.

As part of the redesign, the small Norman Bethune Square was redesigned and enlarged. Sidewalks in the area were also be widened, with additional trees.

As of September 2010, a tunnel links the university's Henry F. Hall and J.W. McConnell buildings with the Guy-Concordia Metro station. The hallway was completed in Spring 2010. However, a project to create a green space on Mackay Street was put on hold.

Administration and governance

Governance
Concordia is led by its president and vice-chancellor (referred to as the president), provost and vice-presidents. The Board of Governors and the Senate manage the university's affairs and academic integrity. The president and the senior leadership ensure transparency and accountability of the administration. The administration is supervised by the Board of Governors and Senate. Under the Charter of Concordia University, the university's highest governing body is the Board of Governors, which has final authority over the affairs of the university. The Senate derives its authority from the Board of Governors.

Academic units

The university has four faculties — Faculty of Arts and Science, Faculty of Fine Arts, Gina Cody School of Engineering and Computer Science and John Molson School of Business — as well as the School of Graduate Studies. The respective faculties supervise the academic departments/institutes. For example, the Faculty of Art and Science oversees the Department of Applied Human Sciences and Simone de Beauvoir Institute.

Finances
In 2020–21 year, Concordia received $523.1 million in revenue. Fifty-three per cent of the university's revenue comes from grants of the Government of Quebec, which are given based on the student population. As of 2022, the university's foundation has $344.004 million in its endowment.  In November 2017, Concordia launched the Campaign for Concordia. The campaign's main target is to raise $250 million to support the university's nine strategic directions that will advance Concordia's position as "Canada’s next-generation university". In January 2018, Concordia President Alan Shepard reported that the university had already reached "more than halfway" of its goal. As of 2021, the campaign is still ongoing.

Academics

Students begin their university studies in September or, in some cases, in January or May. An undergraduate degree normally requires three or four years of full-time study, a master's one to three years, and a PhD at least four years. Diplomas and certificates usually take no longer than a year and a half to complete.

Concordia has more than 400 undergraduate programs under the Faculty of Arts and Science, the Gina Cody School of Engineering and Computer Science, the Faculty of Fine Arts and the John Molson School of Business. Students are normally enrolled in one of these faculties but may take courses from any of the others as part of their studies. Class sizes vary from 30 to 400 students.

The School of Graduate Studies offers about 70 programs leading to master's and doctoral degrees, as well as graduate diplomas and certificates for professionals seeking to upgrade their knowledge and skills.

Concordia Continuing Education offers university-level studies and training to those from diverse backgrounds and stages of life.

The Institute for Co-operative Education administers more than 45 bachelor's and master's programs in an alternating co-op work-study format. Concordia's co-op programs enable students to enrich their learning by participating in career-relevant 12–17-week full-time, paid work terms. Depending on their faculty and major, co-op students will usually graduate with a minimum of 12 months of academically relevant work experience. There are also Industrial Experience and Professional Experience options in certain disciplines that enable students to participate in a summer-only work term. Concordia is a member of the Canadian Association for Co-operative Education (CAFCE).

During the 2020–2021 academic year, there were 37,272 undergraduate students, 9,539 graduate students and 4,442 continuing education students enrolled at Concordia.

Faculty of Arts and Science
Concordia's Faculty of Arts and Science consists of 21 departments and seven colleges, schools and institutes in the humanities, sciences and social sciences at the undergraduate and graduate levels. There are 279 programs, offering more than 2,400 courses. There are 851 full-time and part-time faculty members. During the 2019–2020 academic year, there were 19,724 undergraduate and graduate students enrolled in the faculty.

In addition to regular academic programs, the Faculty of Arts and Science also includes three colleges, two schools and two institutes. These are the Liberal Arts College, the Loyola College for Diversity and Sustainability, the School of Community and Public Affairs, the School of Canadian Irish Studies, the Science College, the Simone de Beauvoir Institute and the Concordia Institute for Canadian Jewish Studies.

The Loyola College for Diversity and Sustainability (formerly Loyola International College) is an interdisciplinary college on the Loyola Campus, the original site of Loyola College. It offers minor programs in Diversity and the Contemporary World and Sustainability Studies.

At the undergraduate level, the Faculty of Arts and Science offers both Bachelor of Arts (BA) and Bachelor of Science (BSc) programs with majors ranging from economics, political science and sociology to actuarial mathematics, biology and ecology.

Gina Cody School of Engineering and Computer Science
The Gina Cody School of Engineering and Computer Science, formerly known as Faculty of Engineering and Computer Science, is named after Concordia alumna Gina Cody, who donated $15 million to the university in 2018. In response, the university renamed its faculty of engineering and computer science in her honour, making it the first engineering school to be named after a woman in Canada and globally. In 2018, Maclean's ranked its programs as one of the best in Canada. The faculty offers 19 undergraduate and 34 graduate-level programs in the following departments: Building, Civil and Environmental Engineering; Centre for Engineering in Society; Computer Science and Software Engineering; Concordia Institute for Information Systems Engineering; Chemical and Materials Engineering; Electrical and Computer Engineering, and Mechanical, Industrial and Aerospace Engineering. The engineering programs are all accredited by the Canadian Engineering Accreditation Board (CEAB). During the 2020–2021 academic year, there were 10,158 undergraduate and graduate students enrolled in the faculty.

Troitsky Bridge Building Competition
The Troitsky Bridge Building Competition brings together engineering students from across Canada and parts of the United States. Teams of students representing their universities must build a 1-metre-long bridge using only regular popsicle sticks, toothpicks, dental floss, and white glue. A panel of judges grades the bridges based on originality and presentation while a hydraulic loading device is used to determine the maximum load and performance.

Faculty of Fine Arts
The Faculty of Fine Arts offers 60 programs at the undergraduate and graduate levels. It includes nine departments and four research institutes. During the 2019–2020 academic year, there were 3,964 undergraduate and graduate students enrolled in the faculty. Among the departments is The Mel Hoppenheim School of Cinema. It is informally identified as MHSoC, and accepts 250 students a year for study in the fields of film animation, film production and film studies. It is the largest, university-based centre for the study of film animation, film production and film studies in Canada.

John Molson School of Business

The John Molson School of Business (formerly the Faculty of Commerce and Administration) offers 18 different programs at the undergraduate and graduate levels from five different departments. The departments are Accountancy, Finance, Marketing, Management and Supply Chain and Business Technology Management. During the 2020–2021 academic year there were 9,915 undergraduate students and graduate students enrolled, and John Molson School has 56,000 alumni. The John Molson School is accredited by the Association to Advance Collegiate Schools of Business (AACSB). The business school is located in a LEED silver-certified building.

Reputation

Concordia University has placed well in postsecondary school rankings. In the 2022 Academic Ranking of World Universities rankings, the university ranked 501–600 in the world. The 2023 QS World University Rankings ranked the university 551–560 in the world. The 2023 Times Higher Education World University Rankings placed Concordia 601–800 in the world. In U.S. News & World Report 2022–23 global university rankings, the university placed 653rd in the world. The university was also ranked by Maclean's Canadian university rankings. In October 2022, Maclean's ranked Concordia 10th in Canada under its comprehensive universities category, tied with Wilfrid Laurier University.

The university's John Molson School of Business was ranked among the top 10 Canadian business schools and the top 100 worldwide by The Economist in 2022. Moreover, Concordia was ranked seventh in Canada and 229th among world universities in the International Professional Classification of Higher Education Institutions, a worldwide ranking compiled by the École des Mines de Paris that uses as its sole criterion the number of graduates occupying the rank of chief executive officer at Fortune 500 companies.

Student life

Student housing
Four residence buildings are available for students who wish to live on campus: Grey Nuns Residence, Jesuit Residence, Hingston Hall (HA) and Hingston Hall (HB).

For students who choose to live off campus, the Concordia Student Union's Off-Campus Housing and Job Bank (HoJo) offers classified ads, legal advice and safety resources.

Sustainability
Concordia's "sustainability hub" promotes sustainable development.
In February 2019, Concordia became the first university in Canada to issue a sustainable bond. According to the university webpage the bond will "generate environmental and social benefits as defined by the United Nations' Sustainable Development Goals". According to Denis Cossette, the university's chief financial officer, "the $25-million senior unsecured bond offers investors a 3.626 per cent yield and has a duration of 20 years." Because of this bond, Concordia would be able to issue sustainable bonds instead of green bonds.

Athletics

Concordia University's athletic teams are called the Concordia Stingers. They compete with other schools in Canadian Interuniversity Sport, and more specifically, in the Quebec Student Sports Federation and the Quebec University Football League. The university has 10 varsity teams. In the fall, teams compete in Canadian football, men's and women's soccer, men's and women's rugby union and sport wrestling. There are female and male wrestlers on the team from year to year, and they compete as one team. In the winter, teams compete in men's and women's ice hockey and men's and women's basketball.

The Concordia Stingers women's ice hockey team won the Canadian national championships in 1998 and 1999. The Stingers baseball club beat Cape Breton University Capers 12–2 to win the 2009 National Baseball Crown.

Student organizations
The Concordia Student Union (CSU) represents undergraduate students. Its membership totals more than 35,000 students. Concordia students voted in favour of accreditation of their student union in a referendum in December 2000. As a result, the CSU is now legally accountable only to its student constituents.

The Graduate Students' Association (GSA) represents the collective interests and promotes the general welfare of the graduate students of Concordia University. Its membership stands at around 9,675 students for the 2018–19 academic year.

Another noteworthy aspect of Concordia University is the number of longstanding fee-levy groups which provide numerous services, funded by the student population in the form of per-credit fees. These include the People's Potato, which offers a four-course vegan meal, the anti-capitalist grocery store, The Frigo Vert, and the Coop Bookstore .

Concordia University is home to local and international fraternities and sororities: 
  - Delta Phi Epsilon sorority, represented by the Beta Pi chapter, was established at Concordia in 1994. 
  - Zeta Tau Omega sorority was founded in 1968 by six women studying at Montreal.
  - Mu Omicron Zeta fraternity (MOZ) was founded in 1992. 
 The Brotherhood of Omicron is another locally based fraternity at Concordia, formed in 1965.
  - Tau Kappa Epsilon fraternity has its Kappa Chi chapter at Concordia, which was founded in 1967 at Loyola College.
  - Alpha Epsilon Pi (ΑΕΠ) — the largest fraternity in Canada—established its Gamma Lambda chapter at Concordia in 2015.
 ΣΘΠ - Sigma Thêta Pi fraternity founded its Mu chapter on the Concordia campus in 2015?, but this has since gone dormant.

Student media
Concordia University has a campus radio station, CJLO, and television station, CUTV. Concordia also has three student-run newspapers, The Link, The Concordian and French-language L'Organe. The Concordian and L'Organe are members of Canadian University Press (CUP); The Link left the CUP network in 2012. The university also assists in the publishing of the only student-run, bilingual literary/arts magazine, The Void, founded in 2002, as well as arts magazine Interfold.

Student activism

Strike of 1999
As the 1990s progressed, student activism began growing, coming to a head in 1999 with the election of the first in a series of radical slates to the Concordia Student Union. Under the presidency of Rob Green, a referendum regarding a strike garnered 2,284 votes of support. This was an unusually strong show of support, as student governments at Concordia are often elected on the basis of less than 1,000 votes in their favour. The strike lasted from November 3 to 5 and targeted a range of issues, including student representation in the university senate, corporate presence and advertising on campus, and government. There were several demonstrations, where both protesters and police were reported to be injured.

Anti-Netanyahu riot

On September 9, 2002, a scheduled speech from the former Israeli Prime Minister Benjamin Netanyahu was cancelled following violent pro-Palestinian riots inside the Henry F. Hall Building. Protestors raised concerns about Israeli human rights abuses in the Palestinian territories, namely in the West Bank and the Gaza Strip. Netanyahu accused protestors of being supporters of terrorism. The event is depicted in a documentary named Confrontation at Concordia.

Notable alumni and faculty

Concordia's alumni and faculty have achieved fame for their accomplishments in many fields. Distinguished alumni include: 
 Mohan Munasinghe, Vice-chair of the Nobel Peace Prize-winning Intergovernmental Panel on Climate Change
 Barbara Davidson, Pulitzer Prize and Emmy Award winning photographer and filmmaker 
 Fashion maven Steven Cojocaru
 Former Governor General of Canada Georges Vanier
 Presidents and chief executive officers of major businesses Dominic D'Alessandro, Mireille Gingras, Gerald T. McCaughey and the late L. Jacques Menard 
 Philosopher Keith Heron
 Authors E. Annie Proulx, Mordecai Richler and Nino Ricci
 Academic Kim Sawchuk 
 Actors James Tupper, Adam Kelly, Patrick Kwok-Choon, Mylène Dinh-Robic and Annie Murphy
 Filmmakers Moyra Davey, Jorge Thielen Armand, René Balcer, Peter Lenkov, Alex Rice, Lynne Stopkewich, B. P. Paquette, Donald Tarlton, Steven Woloshen, Louise Archambault, Maziar Bahari, Simone Rapisarda Casanova, and Yung Chang
 Musicians Emily Haines, Régine Chassagne, Sarah Neufeld, Michael Laucke, Richard Reed Parry, Amy Millan and Matthew Otto of Majical Cloudz
 Painter Pierre Henry
 Athletes Cammi Granato, Jim Corsi, Garry Kallos, and Andy Borodow 
 Dance artist Lara Kramer
 Attorney Kathleen Zellner 
 News anchors Dareen Abu Ghaida and Mutsumi Takahashi
 Mountaineer and speaker Theodore Fairhurst
 Actor, comedian and producer Will Arnett 
 Cultural anthropologist Theresa H. Arriola
 Internet persona and animal rights activist Kadie Karen Diekmeyer

See also
 Bishop Street
 Canadian government scientific research organizations
 Canadian industrial research and development organizations
 Canadian university scientific research organizations
 Space Concordia
 Higher education in Quebec
 List of Jesuit sites
 List of universities in Quebec
 Mel Hoppenheim School of Cinema

References

Further reading
 Austin, Kevin. "[Institutions] Concordia University (Montréal)." eContact! 11.2 – Figures canadiennes (2) / Canadian Figures (2) (July 2009). Montréal: CEC.
 
 Hall, Henry F. Georgian Spirit: The Story of George Williams University(Montréal) Peake 347.H.03.0

External links

 
 
 Concordia University fonds (R9641) at Library and Archives Canada. Fonds consists of oral history interviews conducted by the Concordia University Oral History Program.

 
1974 establishments in Quebec
Educational institutions established in 1974
English-language universities and colleges in Quebec
Universities and colleges in Montreal
Journalism schools in Canada